Coenochroa californiella is a species of snout moth in the genus Coenochroa. It was described by Émile Louis Ragonot in 1887. It is found in North America from British Columbia to California, Kansas, Texas, Mexico and Panama in Central America.

References

Moths described in 1887
Phycitinae